Shimao International Center is a skyscraper located in Fuzhou, Fujian, China. The building's main usage is for commercial offices. At 273 meters (896 feet) it is the tallest building in Fuzhou.

See also
List of tallest buildings in China
Shimao Property

References

External links

Hotel buildings completed in 2010
Office buildings completed in 2010
2010 establishments in China